Oglesby Independent School District is a public school district based in Oglesby, Texas (USA).

Located in Coryell County, a small portion of the district extends into McLennan County.

The district operates one school Oglesby School serving grades K-12.

Academic achievement
In 2009, the school district was rated "academically acceptable" by the Texas Education Agency.

Special programs

Athletics
Oglesby High School plays six-man football.

See also

List of school districts in Texas 
List of high schools in Texas

References

External links
 Oglesby ISD

School districts in Coryell County, Texas
School districts in McLennan County, Texas